Adolf Waser (born 5 February 1938) is a Swiss rower. He competed in the men's coxed pair event at the 1964 Summer Olympics.

References

External links
 

1938 births
Living people
Swiss male rowers
Olympic rowers of Switzerland
Rowers at the 1964 Summer Olympics
Place of birth missing (living people)
World Rowing Championships medalists for Switzerland